Marilyn Martha Lantry (born October 28, 1932) is an American politician in the state of Minnesota. She served in the Minnesota Senate from 1981 to 1990.

References

1932 births
Living people
Politicians from Saint Paul, Minnesota
Women state legislators in Minnesota
Republican Party Minnesota state senators
21st-century American women